Desi Mokonin (born 12 July 1997) is a Bahraini long-distance runner. She competed in the women's 10,000 metres at the 2017 World Championships in Athletics, placing 15th in 31:55.34. In 2019, she competed in the senior women's race at the 2019 IAAF World Cross Country Championships held in Aarhus, Denmark. She finished in 28th place.

References

External links
 

1997 births
Living people
Bahraini female long-distance runners
World Athletics Championships athletes for Bahrain
Place of birth missing (living people)
20th-century Bahraini people
21st-century Bahraini people